Limnology and Oceanography Letters (L&O Letters) is a bimonthly, online open access, and peer-reviewed scientific journal focused on publishing innovative and trend-setting studies in all aspects of limnology and oceanography. It was established in 2016 and publishes four types of articles; Letters, Essays, Current Evidence, and Data Articles. L&O Letters is published through the Association for the Sciences of Limnology and Oceanography in partnership with John Wiley and Sons. Occasionally, L&O Letters publishes special issues focused on a specific topic in aquatic systems in addition to the six regular issues published each year.

List of editors 

 Patricia A. Soranno (20162019)
 James E. Cloern (2019present)

References

External links

English-language journals
Bimonthly journals
Open access journals
Publications established in 2016